Taniwharau may refer to:

Taniwha
Taniwharau Rugby League Club, rugby league club in Huntly